A Low Down Dirty Shame is a 1994 American action comedy film written, directed by, and starring Keenen Ivory Wayans. The film also stars Charles S. Dutton, Jada Pinkett, and Salli Richardson.

Plot 
Former LAPD detective Andre Shame is a private investigator who owns A Low Down Dirty Shame Investigations. He runs it with Peaches, whom he arrested six years earlier and for whom he has developed romantic feelings. Despite the high-risk jobs, Shame is unable to keep the firm afloat, and may be forced to close.

Five years ago, Shame and a team of detectives went into Mexico to apprehend drug lord Ernesto Mendoza. Though Shame seemingly shot and killed Mendoza in a shoot-out, the other detectives were killed, with Shame and Sonny Rothmiller being the only survivors. This caused Shame to leave the force in disgrace.

In the present day, Rothmiller, who is now working for the DEA, tells him that Mendoza is still alive. He hires Shame to find the only witness who would testify against him...his ex-girlfriend Angela, who was caught in the middle of a love triangle with the two men. Angela escaped from the Witness Protection Program in New York and is in LA. Shame is hesitant at first, but seeing this as a chance to arrest the man who took everything from him, decides to take the case.

Shame gets information on one of Mendoza's lieutenants, Luis, Shame's former childhood acquaintance, then goes to a restaurant and has Luis warn Mendoza that Shame is coming for him.  Upon arriving home, Shame is attacked by Mendoza's henchmen and warned by a very much alive Mendoza to back away.

With the help of Peaches and her roommate Wayman, Shame tracks Angela to a posh hotel, and calls Sonny. Shame explains that he originally went to Mexico for her. She tells Shame that she was going to testify against Mendoza, but Mendoza found her location, forcing her to flee. Shame discovers that Rothmiller is working for Mendoza, and the two barely escape Mendoza's thugs. Shame drops Angela at Peaches’.

Shame cleans himself up, then abducts Luis and takes him to an abandoned building. When Luis refuses to give Shame Mendoza's whereabouts, Shame has him stumble into a meeting of white supremacists. With the supremacists chasing him, he gives Shame his boss's location in exchange for a ride. But Shame leaves him at their mercy.

At the club, Shame and Mendoza exchange words, then get into a Mexican standoff with Mendoza using his date as a hostage. When Wayman attempts to get Shame's attention, Mendoza uses the distraction to escape. Shame goes to Peaches to find Angela gone (she and Peaches had gotten into an argument earlier), and Capt. Nunez waiting for him. He has Nunez place Peaches in protective custody and heads off to find Angela.

Shame meets Angela at a storage locker and discovers the real reason Mendoza wants her dead: she stole $20 million of his money. At a motel, Shame receives a call from Mendoza informing him he has kidnapped Peaches; and will exchange her for Angela and his money. The two agree to meet at a Mendoza owned-shopping mall. Angela tries to convince Shame to leave with her, yet admitting that he cares for Peaches, Shame refuses and the two of them head to the mall.

Before the exchange, Sonny admits he killed the other detectives because they wouldn't take Mendoza's bribe without Shame. He left Shame alive to take the blame. Peaches and Angela are placed on the escalator, and Mendoza discovers that Angela is a mannequin. With a gun hidden on the escalator Peaches begins shooting. Shame kills the mercenaries hired by Sonny, Luis is attacked by the dogs that were supposed trying to kill Shame, and Sonny is killed by Angela.

Mendoza captures Peaches, only to be confronted by Shame. After winning a fistfight, Shame arrests Mendoza, who is then killed by Angela. She attempts to kill Shame, telling him she knows he won’t allow her to keep the money she stole. Peaches comes and fights off Angela. Nunez threatens to arrest Shame, but Shame reminds Nunez that he helped take down a drug lord, identified Sonny as the DEA mole, found a federal witness on the run (Angela, who is lead away in handcuffs for her crimes), and recovered $15 million in stolen drug money. Shame keeps $5 million for expenses, with Peaches getting perks of a romantic relationship with Shame.

Cast
 Keenen Ivory Wayans as Andre Shame
 Jada Pinkett as "Peaches" Jordan
 Andrew Divoff as Ernesto Mendoza
 Charles S. Dutton as Sonny Rothmiller
 Salli Richardson as Angela Flowers
 Chris Spencer as Benny
 Corwin Hawkins as Wayman Harrington
 Don Diamont as Chad
 Gary Cervantes as Luis
 Gregory Sierra as Captain Nunez
 Andrew Shaifer as Bernard
 Kim Wayans as Diane
 René Hicks as Hooker

Soundtrack 

A soundtrack containing hip hop and R&B music was released on November 8, 1994, by Hollywood Records and Jive Records. It peaked at #70 on the Billboard 200 and #14 on the Top R&B/Hip-Hop Albums.

Reception 
On review aggregator website Rotten Tomatoes, with 23 reviews, the film has an approval rating of 4%, receiving an average rating of 3.8/10. The website's critics consensus reads: "A trifecta of failure for writer-director-star Keenen Ivory Wayans, A Low Down Dirty Shame lives repeatedly and resolutely down to its title."

Year-end lists 
 Top 10 worst (not ranked) – Dan Webster, The Spokesman-Review
 Top 18 worst (alphabetically listed, not ranked) – Michael Mills, The Palm Beach Post

References

External links 
 
 
 

1994 films
1994 action comedy films
American detective films
African-American action comedy films
Films set in California
Films set in Los Angeles
Films shot in California
1990s police comedy films
American police detective films
Caravan Pictures films
Hollywood Pictures films
Films directed by Keenen Ivory Wayans
Films produced by Joe Roth
Films produced by Roger Birnbaum
1994 comedy films
1990s English-language films
1990s American films